The List of programs broadcast by Disney Channel (Germany) lists various series and shows that are broadcast, have been broadcast or are about to be broadcast by Disney Channel in Germany. The program in daytime (from 5:30 am to 8:14 pm) is aimed primarily at toddlers and children, while the program in prime time (from 8:15 pm to 5:29 am) is aimed at teenagers and adults. Teleshopping programs are not included in this list. The entire TV program is broadcast in German. For this purpose, foreign-language series and shows receive a German dubbing.

Disney Channel Germany Original Productions

Daytime

Primetime

Current programming

Daytime 
50/50 Heroes (Halbe Helden)
Alice’s Wonderland Bakery (Alice in der Wunderland-Bäckerei)
Art Attack
Big City Greens
Bluey
Chip 'n' Dale: Park Life (Chip und Chap: Das Leben im Park)
DuckTales
GhostForce 
The Ghost and Molly McGee (Der Geist und Molly McGee)
Go Away, Unicorn! (Immer dieses Einhorn)
Gus, the Itsy Bitsy Knight (Gus – Der klitzekleine Ritter)
Marvel's Moon Girl and Devil Dinosaur
Mère et Fille (Maman & Ich)
Mickey and the Roadster Racers (Micky und die flinken Flitzer)
Mickey Mouse (Micky Maus)
Mickey Mouse Funhouse (Micky Maus: Spielhaus)
Milo Murphy's Law (Schlimmer geht's immer mit Milo Murphy)
Miraculous Ladybug (Miraculous – Geschichten von Ladybug und Cat Noir)
My Little Pony: Pony Life
Phineas and Ferb (Phineas und Ferb)
The Owl House  (Willkommen im Haus der Eulen)
PJ Masks (PJ Masks - Pyjamahelden)
Puppy Dog Pals (Welpen Freunden)
Rainbow High
Spidey and His Amazing Friends (Spidey und seine Super-Freunde)
Taffy
T.O.T.S. 
The Unstoppable Yellow Yeti (Der fantastische Yellow Yeti)
Viking Skool (Wikinger-Schule)

Primetime 
According to Jim (Immer wieder Jim) 
Home Improvement (Hör mal, wer da hämmert)
Remington Steele

Upcoming Programming
Kirby: Right Back at Ya! (New episodes August 28)

Former programming

Daytime 
The 7D (Die 7Z)
101 Dalmatian Street (Das Haus der 101 Dalmatiner)
101 Dalmatians: The Series (101 Dalmatiner) 
Ace Lightning
Adventures of the Gummi Bears (Gummibärenbande)
A Kind of Magic (A Kind of Magic - Eine magische Familie)
Aladdin
Alex & Co.
American Dragon: Jake Long (American Dragon)
Amphibia
Andi Mack (Story of Andi)
A.N.T. Farm (A.N.T.: Achtung Natur-Talente)
Arthur and the Invisibles (Arthur und die Minimoys)
Atomic Betty
Austin & Ally
As the Bell Rings (Endlich Pause!)
The Adventures of Swiss Family Robinson (Die Robinsons – Aufbruch ins Ungewisse)
Backstage
Bear in the Big Blue House (Der Bär im großen blauen Haus)
Best Bugs Forever (Käfer-City)
Best Friends Whenever (Best Friends - Zu jeder Zeit)
Big Hero 6 (Baymax – Robowabohu in Serie)
Bizaardvark
The Basil Brush Show (Die Basil Brush Show)
Benjamin Blümchen
Bob the Builder
The Boss Baby: Back in Business (The Boss Baby – Wieder im Geschäft)
Bonkers (Bonkers, der listige Luchs von Hollywood)
The Book of Pooh (Winnie Puuhs Bilderbuch)
Boyster
Brandy and Mr. Whiskers
Bunk'd (Camp Kikiwaka)
Bunnytown (Hoppelhausen)
Buzz Lightyear of Star Command (Captain Buzz Lightyear – Star Command)
The Buzz on Maggie (Maggie)
Caitlin's Way (Caitlin)
Captain Flamingo
Cars Toons (Cars Toons – Hooks unglaubliche Geschichten)
Chiamatemi Giò (Hey, Gio!)
Chip 'n Dale: Rescue Rangers (Chip und Chap – Die Ritter des Rechts)
Cloudy with a Chance of Meatballs (Wolkig mit Aussicht auf Fleischbällchen)
Cory in the House (Einfach Cory!)
Connie the Cow (Connie, der kleine Kuh)
Committed (Committed – Eine Mutter steht Kopf)
Crash & Bernstein 
Crash Zone (Crash Zone – Das Computer-Team)
Darkwing Duck
Dave the Barbarian (Barbaren-Dave)
Descendants: Wicked World (Descendants – Verhexte Welt)
Dinosaurs (Die Dinos)
Dinosaur Train (Dino Zug) 
Doc McStuffins (Doc McStuffins, Spielzeugärztin)
Dog with a Blog (Hund mit Blog)
Doug
Dragon (Dragon – Der kleine blaue Drache)
Dreamkix (Dreamkix - Die tierische Elf)
DuckTales (DuckTales – Neues aus Entenhausen)
Elena of Avalor (Elena von Avalor) 
Eliot Kid (Eliot)
Endangered Species (Voll verrückte Viecher)
The Emperor's New School (Kuzcos Königsklasse)
Even Stevens (Eben ein Stevens)
Evermoor
The Fairly OddParents (Cosmo und Wanda – Wenn Elfen helfen)
Fairy Tale Police Department (F.T.P.D. – Die Märchenpolizei)
Famous 5: On the Case (Fünf Freunde – Für alle Fälle)
The Famous Jett Jackson (Jett Jackson)
Fillmore!
Fish Hooks (Der Fisch-Club) 
Frozen: Northern Lights (Die Eiskönigin: Zauber der Polarlichter)
Franny's Feet (Frannys Wunderschuhe)
Girl Meets World (Das Leben und Riley) 
Goldie & Bear (Goldie und Bär)
Good Luck Charlie (Meine Schwester Charlie)
Goof Troop (Goofy und Max)
Gravity Falls (Willkommen in Gravity Falls)
Guardians of the Galaxy
Handy Manny (Meister Manny's Werkzeugkiste)
Hannah Montana
Harry and His Bucket Full of Dinosaurs (Harry und sein Eimer voller Dinos)
Have a Laugh! (Kicherkracher)
Henry Hugglemonster (Henry Knuddelmonster)
Hercules
Higglytown Heroes (Higglystadt Helden)
The Hive (Summ, summ, super!)
Honey, I Shrunk the Kids: The TV Show (Liebling, ich habe die Kinder geschrumpft)
House of Mouse (Mickys Clubhaus)
I Didn't Do It (Ich war's nicht)
Imagination Movers (Die Ideen-Meister)
In a Heartbeat (Heartbeat)
I.N.K. Invisible Network of Kids (I.N.K.)
Jake & Blake
Jake and the Never Land Pirates (Jake und die Nimmerland-Piraten)
The Jersey (Trikot der Champions)
Jessie
Jim Button (Jim Knopf)
Jonas Brothers: Living the Dream (Jonas Brothers – Eine Band lebt ihren Traum)
Jonas L.A.
JoJo's Circus (Jojos Zirkus)
Johnny and the Sprites (Johnny und die Sprites)
Julius Jr.
Jungle Cubs (Die Dschungelbuch-Kids)
Jungle Junction (Dschungel, Dschungel!)
Justin Time (Der Phantastische Paul)
K.C. Undercover
Kickin' It (Karate-Chaoten)
Kick Buttowski: Suburban Daredevil (Kick Buttowski - Keiner kann alles)
Kikoumba: Crown Down! (Kikoumba – Her mit der Krone!)
Kim Possible
Kirby: Right Back at Ya! (Kirby)
Kung Fu Panda: The Paws of Destiny (Kung Fu Panda – Die Tatzen des Schicksals)
Lab Rats (S3 – Stark, schnell, schlau)
The Land Before Time (In einem Land unserer Zeit)
Lanfeust Quest (Lanfeust)
Legend of the Three Caballeros (Die Legende der Drei Caballeros)
Legends of the Ring of Fire (Legenden aus dem Ring des Feuers)
The Legend of Tarzan (Tarzan)
Lego Marvel Super Heroes: Maximum Overload (Marvel Super Heroes-Maximale Superkräfte)
Lego Star Wars: Droid Tales (Lego Star Wars: Die Droiden Story)
Lego Star Wars: The Freemaker Adventures (Star Wars: Die Abenteuer der Freemaker)
Leon
Life with Derek (Mensch Derek!)
Lilo and Stitch: The Series (Lilo & Stitch)
Li'l Horrors (Little Horrors)
The Lion Guard (Die Garde der Löwen)
Little Einsteins (Kleine Einsteins)
The Little Mermaid (Arielle, die Meerjungfrau)
Liv and Maddie
Lizzie McGuire
Lloyd in Space (Lloyd im All)
The Lodge
Lost in Oz
Lucky Fred
Maggie & Bianca Fashion Friends
The Magic School Bus (Der Zauberschulbus)
Mama Mirabelle's Home Movies (Mama Mirabelles Tierkino)
Matt's Monsters (Matzes Monster)
Max & Ruby
Meg and Mog (Meg und Mog)
Men in Black: The Series (Men in Black: Die Serie)
Meteor and the Mighty Monster Trucks (Meteor, der kleine Monstertruck)
Mickey Mouse Clubhouse (Micky Maus Wunderhaus)
Mickey Mouse Works (Neue Micky Maus Geschichten)
Mighty Ducks (Mighty Ducks – Das Powerteam)
Mighty Med (Mighty Med – Wir heilen Helden)
Miles from Tomorrowland (Miles von Morgen)
Mush-Mush and the Mushables (Flipi und die Pilzlinge)
The Mummy (Die Mumie – Das Geheimnis der Mumie)
Muppet Babies
My Babysitter's a Vampire (Mein Babysitter ist ein Vampir)
My Dad the Rock Star (Mein Dad ist’n Rockstar)
My Friends Tigger & Pooh (Meine Freunde Tigger und Puuh)
My Little Pony: Equestria Girls
My Little Pony: Friendship Is Magic (My Little Pony - Freundschaft ist Magie)
My Parents Are Aliens (Meine Eltern, die Aliens)
The New Adventures of Winnie the Pooh (Neue Abenteuer mit Winnie Puuh)
Nouky & Friends (Nouky und seine Freunde)
Odd Family (Zwillinge auf Zack)
The Octonauts (Die Oktonauten)
Oggy and the Cockroaches (Oggy und die Kakerlaken)
O11CE (11)
Our Gang (Die kleinen Strolche)
Overruled! (Jared ‚Coop‘ Cooper – Highschoolanwalt)
Ozie Boo! 
Packages from Planet X (Paket von X)
Pac-Man and the Ghostly Adventures (Pac-Man und die Geisterabenteuer)
Pair of Kings (Pair of Kings - Die Königsbrüder)
Parker Lewis Can't Lose (Parker Lewis – Der Coole von der Schule)
Pat the Dog (Pat der Hund)
PB&J Otter (PB&J Otter – Die Rasselbande vom Hoohaw-See)
Pepper Ann
Phil of the Future (Phil aus der Zukunft)
Pinky Dinky Doo
Pippi Langstrumpf
The Powerpuff Girls (Die Powerpuff Girls)
Pound Puppies (Pound Puppies – Der Pfotenclub)
The Proud Family (Die Prouds)
The Psammy Show (Die Psammy Show)
Pucca
Quack Pack (Quack Pack – Onkel D. und die Boys)
Rainbow Fish (Der Regenbogenfisch)
Randy Cunningham: 9th Grade Ninja (Randy Cunningham: Der Ninja aus der 9. Klasse)
Recess (Große Pause)
The Replacements (Tauschrausch)
Rolie Polie Olie
Rolling with the Ronks! (Ronks – Keine Steinzeit ohne Alien!)
Round the Twist (Twist total – Eine australische Familie legt los)
Royal Ranch
Rugrats
Sabrina: The Animated Series (Simsalabim Sabrina)
Sabrina: Secrets of a Teenage Witch (Sabrina – Verhext nochmal!)
Sadie Sparks (Gilbert und Sadie)
Sally Bollywood
Sandra the Fairytale Detective (Sandra & Ko – Die Märchendetektive)
Scaredy Squirrel (Eddie Angsthorn)
The Secret World of Alex Mack (Was ist los mit Alex Mack?)
The Secret Show (Die Top Secret Show)
Sheriff Callie's Wild West (Sheriff Callie's wilder Westen)
Shake It Up (Shake It Up – Tanzen ist alles)
Shorty McShorts' Shorts (Die Shorty McShort Show)
Sister, Sister
The Smurfs (Die Schlümpfe)
Sofia the First (Sofia die Erste – Auf einmal Prinzessin)
Sonny with a Chance (Sonny Munroe)
So Weird (Fionas Website)
Soy Luna
SpangaS (Spangas – Das ist das Leben)
Special Agent Oso (Spezialagent Oso)
Spider-Man (Spider-Man)
Staines Down Drains (Fleckgeflutscht!)
Stanley
Star Wars Forces of Destiny (Star Wars: Die Mächte des Schicksals)
Star vs. the Forces of Evil (Star gegen die Mächte des Bösen)
Stitch! (Yuna & Stitch)
Stuck in the Middle (Mittendrin und kein Entkommen)
Student Bodies
Super 4: Heroes United (Super 4)
The Super Hero Squad Show
Tales of Friendship with Winnie the Pooh (Freundschafts-Geschichten mit Winnie Puuh)
TaleSpin (Käpt’n Balu und seine tollkühne Crew)
Tangled: The Series (Rapunzel – Die Serie)
Tara Duncan
Teacher's Pet (Klassenhund)
Teamo Supremo
This is Daniel Cook (Hier ist Daniel Cook)
That's So Raven (Raven blickt durch)
Timon and Pumbaa (Abenteuer mit Timon und Pumbaa)
Totally Spies! 
Toy Story Toons  
TroTro 
Tsum Tsum 
Tupu (Tupu – Das wilde Mädchen aus dem Central Park)
Tutenstein
Ultimate Spider-Man (Der ultimative Spider-Man)
Vicky the Viking (Wickie und die starken Männer)
Violetta
Walk the Prank (Schreck-Attack)
Wander Over Yonder (Sie nannten ihn Wander)
Walt Disney Cartoon Classics (Disneys Classic Cartoon)
Walt Disney's Wonderful World of Color (Walt Disneys bunte Welt)
We Bare Bears (We Bare Bears – Bären wie wir)
The Weekenders (Wochenend-Kids)
Wizards of Waverly Place (Die Zauberer vom Waverly Place)
Woofy
Zeke and Luther (Zeke und Luther)
The ZhuZhus
Zombie Hotel (Grufthotel Grabesruh)
Zou (Zeo)
Vampirina

Primetime 
8 Simple Rules (Meine wilden Töchter)
Atelier Fontana - Le sorelle della moda (Atelier Fontana)
Baby Daddy  
Blossom
Boy Meets World (Das Leben und Ich)
Brotherly Love (Wilde Brüder mit Charme!)
Buffy the Vampire Slayer
Bunheads (New in Paradise) 
Cedar Cove (Cedar Cove – Das Gesetz des Herzens)
Chasing Life
Clueless (Clueless – Die Chaos-Clique)
The Conners (Die Conners) 
Desperate Housewives
Dharma & Greg (Dharma und Greg)
El Dorado
Everwood
Everybody Loves Raymond (Alle lieben Raymond)
Finding Carter
The Flintstones (Familie Feuerstein)
The Fosters
Friends
Galavant
Gargoyles (Gargoyles - Auf den Schwingen der Gerechtigkeit)
Gilmore Girls
The Goldbergs (Die Goldbergs)
The Golden Girls (Golden Girls) 
The Golden Palace (Golden Palace)
Gran Hotel (Grand Hotel)
Hindsight
Jane by Design
Life Unexpected (Life Unexpected - Plötzlich Familie)
Little House on the Prairie (Unsere kleine Farm)
The Lying Game
Mad About You (Verrückt nach Dir)
Men in Trees
Miranda
Modern Family
The Munsters Today (Familie Munster)
The Muppet Show (Die Muppet Show)
The Musketeers (Die Musketiere)
The Nanny (Die Nanny)
The Neighbors
New Girl
Once Upon a Time (Once Upon a Time – Es war einmal ...)
Pushing Daisies
Roseanne 
Sabrina the Teenage Witch (Sabrina – total verhext!)
Scrubs (Scrubs – Die Anfänger)
Seed
Star-Crossed
Star Wars Rebels
Suburgatory
Switched at Birth 
Teen Angel
This Is Us (This Is Us – Das ist Leben)
White Collar
My Wife and Kids (What's Up, Dad?)

References

External links 
 The complete program from 1999-2013 (pay TV era) at a glance on fernsehserien.de
 The complete program since 2014 (free TV era) at a glance  on fernsehserien.de

 
Disney Channel Germany
Disney Channel related-lists